Hedroxena is a genus of moth in the family Cosmopterigidae. It contains only one species, Hedroxena barbara, which is found on the New Hebrides.

References

External links
Natural History Museum Lepidoptera genus database

Cosmopterigidae
Monotypic moth genera